Derrick Boat No. 8, also known as DB 8, is a historic floating derrick located at Oswego, Oswego County, New York.  It was built in 1927, and it is one of the few surviving steam-powered floating derricks to have worked on the New York State Barge Canal.  It has a 75 foot by 28 foot hull composed of both riveted and welded heavy steel plate.  The site of the vessel's caretaker is the H. Lee White Marine Museum.

It was added to the National Register of Historic Places in 2015.

References

Ships on the National Register of Historic Places in New York (state)
Buildings and structures in Oswego County, New York
National Register of Historic Places in Oswego County, New York
Crane vessels
Floating cranes
Individual cranes (machines)
Museum ships in New York (state)
1927 ships